The Pozzo di San Patrizio (English: "St. Patrick's Well") is a historic well in Orvieto, Umbria, central Italy. It was built by the architect-engineer Antonio da Sangallo the Younger of Florence, between 1527 and 1537, at the behest of Pope Clement VII who had taken refuge at Orvieto during the sack of Rome in 1527 by the Holy Roman Emperor Charles V, and feared that the city's water supply would be insufficient in the event of a siege. The well was completed in 1537 during the papacy of Pope Paul III.

The name was inspired by medieval legends that St. Patrick's Purgatory in Ireland gave access down to Purgatory, indicating something very deep.

The architect-engineer Antonio da Sangallo the Younger surrounded the central well shaft with two helical ramps in a double helix, accessed by two doors, which allowed mules to carry empty and full water vessels separately in downward and upward directions without obstruction. There are 248 steps and 70 windows provide illumination.

A Latin inscription on the well states QUOD NATURA MUNIMENTO INVIDERAT INDUSTRIA ADIECIT 'what nature stinted for provision, industry has supplied'.

Gallery

Notes

References
 Review of Pozzo di San Patrizio (St. Patrick's Well) at Frommers (tourism site)

Buildings and structures completed in 1537
Buildings and structures in Umbria
Double spiral staircases
Water wells
1537 establishments in the Papal States